James Wemyss may refer to:

 James Wemyss, Lord Burntisland (died 1682), husband of Margaret Wemyss, 3rd Countess of Wemyss
 James Wemyss, 5th Earl of Wemyss (1699–1756), grandson of the preceding, Scottish peer
 James Wemyss (1726–1786), son of the preceding, Scottish MP
 James Erskine Wemyss (1789–1854), grandson of the preceding, Scottish admiral and MP
 James Hay Erskine Wemyss (1829–1864), son of the preceding, Scottish MP
 James Wemyss (New Zealand politician) (1828–1909), Member of Parliament in Nelson, New Zealand
 James Wemyss (British Army officer) (1748–1833), major during American Revolutionary War at Battle of Fishdam Ford

See also
 James Weams (1851–1911), aka James Wemyss, Durham comedian and singer/songwriter